2003 Malta Open is a darts tournament, which took place in Malta in 2003.

Results

References

2003 in darts
2003 in Maltese sport
Darts in Malta